Anne Catherine Roberta Geddes-Harvey (née Geddes; 25 December 1849 – 22 April 1930) was a Canadian organist, choirmaster and composer.

Early life and education
Roberta Geddes was born in Hamilton, Ontario, and studied music with Arthur E. Fisher, Humfrey Anger and Edward Fisher, graduating with a Bachelor of Music degree from Trinity College, Toronto, in 1899.

Career
After completing her studies, Geddes-Harvey worked as an organist in Hamilton, and then took a position in 1876 as choirmaster and organist at St. George's Anglican Church in Guelph; she continued in this position for more than fifty years. She died in Guelph, Ontario, in 1930.

Works
Geddes-Harvey wrote hymns, anthems, songs, and instrumental works bearing copyright dates from 1897 to 1919. Selected works include:
La Terre Bonne (The Land of the Maple Leaf) libretto by A. Klugh (lost)
The Old Boys Welcome, single remaining song from La Terre Bonne
Salvator, oratorio to words from the scriptures

References

1849 births
1930 deaths
19th-century classical composers
20th-century classical composers
Women classical composers
Canadian classical composers
Musicians from Hamilton, Ontario
Canadian classical organists
University of Toronto alumni
20th-century Canadian composers
Women organists
20th-century women composers
19th-century women composers
Canadian women composers